Bharetta cinnamomea is a species of moth of the  family Lasiocampidae. It is found in China, Bhutan and India.

References

Moths described in 1866
Lasiocampidae